Pango is a community located in the south-eastern part of Efate, Vanuatu.

The name Pango was given by early Samoan missionaries who arrived in the 1840s.

Population
Pango village has a population of not more than 208 since 1867 which later increased to 2,000 as of 2011. It has 1600 Registered Voters.

The traditional governance is governed by the paramount jif related to as the Marik Naot(chief) "Maseiman (Star bird)", The chiefs council are collectively made of 8 tribal chiefs(Masei-Laru) representing 8 tribes(8 Naflak);
Kram
Noai
Natongrau
Naniu
Mgal
Naptam
Mleo
Wit

Populated places in Vanuatu
Shefa Province

Notable people 

 Litiana Kalsrap - climate activist and youth leader.